Monte Cristo is a 1922 American silent drama film produced and distributed by Fox Film Corporation and directed by Emmett J. Flynn. It is based on the 1844 novel The Count of Monte Cristo by Alexandre Dumas, which was adapted by 19th century thespian Charles Fechter and written for this screen version by Bernard McConville. John Gilbert plays the hero with Estelle Taylor as the leading lady. This film was long thought lost until a print surfaced in the Czech Republic. The film has been released on DVD, packaged with Gilbert's 1926 MGM film Bardelys the Magnificent.

Cast 
John Gilbert as Edmond Dantes, the Count of Monte Cristo
Estelle Taylor as Mercedes, Countess de Morcerf
Robert McKim as De Villefort, the king's public prosecutor
William V. Mong as Caderousse, the innkeeper
Virginia Brown Faire as Haidee, an Arabian princess
George Siegmann as Luigi Vampa, ex-pirate
Spottiswoode Aitken as Abbe Faria
Ralph Cloninger as Fernand, Count de Morcerf
Albert Prisco as Baron Danglars
Al. W. Filson as Morrel, shipowner (as Al Filson)
Harry Lonsdale as Dantes, father of Edmond
Francis McDonald as Benedetto
Jack Cosgrave as Governor of Chateau d'If (as Jack Cosgrove)
Maude George as Baroness Danglars
Renée Adorée as Eugenie Danglars, her daughter

References

External links

1922 films
American silent feature films
American black-and-white films
American films based on plays
Films based on The Count of Monte Cristo
Films directed by Emmett J. Flynn
1922 romantic drama films
American romantic drama films
Fox Film films
Films based on adaptations
1920s rediscovered films
1920s historical romance films
American historical romance films
Articles containing video clips
Rediscovered American films
1920s American films
Silent romantic drama films
Silent adventure films
Silent American drama films
1920s English-language films
Silent historical romance films